Themistoclesia is a genus of flowering plants belonging to the family Ericaceae.

Its native range is western parts of South America and it is found in Bolivia, Colombia, Costa Rica, Ecuador, Panamá, Peru and Venezuela.

The genus name of Themistoclesia is in honour of Themistocles (c. 525 BC – c. 459 BC), an Athenian politician and military leader. 
It was first described and published in Linnaea Vol.24 on page 41 in 1851.

Known species
According to Kew:

Themistoclesia alata 
Themistoclesia anfracta 
Themistoclesia campii 
Themistoclesia compacta 
Themistoclesia compta 
Themistoclesia crassifolia 
Themistoclesia cremasta 
Themistoclesia cuatrecasasii 
Themistoclesia dependens 
Themistoclesia diazii 
Themistoclesia dryanderae 
Themistoclesia epiphytica 
Themistoclesia flexuosa 
Themistoclesia fosbergii 
Themistoclesia geniculata 
Themistoclesia hirsuta 
Themistoclesia horquetensis 
Themistoclesia idiocalyx 
Themistoclesia inflata 
Themistoclesia mucronata 
Themistoclesia orientalis 
Themistoclesia pariensis 
Themistoclesia pennellii 
Themistoclesia pentandra 
Themistoclesia peruviana 
Themistoclesia recondita 
Themistoclesia recurva 
Themistoclesia rostrata 
Themistoclesia siranensis 
Themistoclesia smithiana 
Themistoclesia tunquiniensis 
Themistoclesia unduavensis 
Themistoclesia vegasana 
Themistoclesia woytkowskii

References

Ericaceae
Ericaceae genera
Plants described in 1845
Flora of Costa Rica
Flora of Panama
Flora of Venezuela
Flora of western South America